Louis H. Narcisse (April 27, 1921 – February 3, 1989), also known as King Louis H. Narcisse, was an American religious leader and the founder of the Mt. Zion Spiritual Church. He claimed religious leaders of the time such as Father Divine, Daddy Grace and, James F. Jones were his divine predecessors.

He was an organizer and spiritual healer in Oakland, California. He was also a gospel minister, vocalist, musician, and composer with whom gospel singer Mahalia Jackson often collaborated. He was the uncle of renowned African-American gospel singer Bessie Griffin (July 6, 1922 – April 10, 1989). They died within days of each other in 1989.

Early life
Louis Herbert Narcisse was born on April 27, 1921, in New Orleans, Louisiana, to Stella Narcisse. His father, Jesse Narcisse, was killed in a shipboard accident before his birth. The youngest of four siblings, Narcisse came from a devout Baptist family. At an early age, young Narcisse knew that he had been touched by the hand of God. His family found out early on that Narcisse was something very special, a religious child prodigy who was reserved but loved to pray and sing spiritual music. His singing talents were first locally recognized in New Orleans when he was a teenager, where Narcisse won five radio auditions. As a teen, he became a soloist at church services and funerals.

Ministry
At 18 years old, Narcisse entered into the Christian ministry in the summer of 1939. Narcisse migrated to California during World War II when God spoke to him to come to California. He found a job in Hunter's Point Shipyards in San Francisco, California as an electrical worker earning $85 a week.  He lived at a Hunter's Point War World II Housing Project.

In South San Francisco the Mt. Zion movement began with a small prayer meeting," from there Narcisse founded Mount Zion Spiritual Temple in Oakland on November 8, 1945 under the credo "It's nice to be nice."  The church was named after his boyhood church in New Orleans, Mt. Zion Baptist Church, which had been the place of his baptism, but Narcisse's Mount Zion Spiritual Temple was actually a Spiritualist church in the African-American Spiritual Church Movement tradition. As his popularity grew, he presided over several churches in Oakland, Sacramento, Houston, and Detroit, and travelled between them.

Death
Narcisse died February 3, 1989, of a heart attack in his Detroit mansion. He was interred at Rolling Hills Memorial Park in Richmond, California.

Discography

1950: Rev. Louis Narcisse
1951: Rev. Louis Narcisse & the Celestial Tones
1953: Bishop Narcisse
1955: Bishop Louis H. Narcisse and Mt. Zion Spiritual Choir
1959: Bishop H. Narcisse
1959: King Louis H. Narcisse & His Wings of Faith Choir
1960: Leaning on Jesus
1962/64: His Grace King Louis H. Narcisse

References

1921 births
1989 deaths
African-American Christian clergy
American Christian clergy
African-American history in Oakland, California
People from Oakland, California
Religious leaders from the San Francisco Bay Area
20th-century American clergy
20th-century African-American people